Julius Debrah (born 24 April 1966) is a Ghanaian politician and former chief of staff to the former President of Ghana John Dramani Mahama. He is a member of the National Democratic Congress. In February 2015, he was appointed chief of staff after the former, Prosper Douglas Bani was removed from office and assigned to as Ambassador Extraordinaire and Plenipotentiary. Debrah previously held the positions of Minister of Local Government and Rural Development and Regional Minister for Eastern Region.

Education 
Debrah studied at Mpraeso Secondary School then moved to Achimota Secondary School for A Levels from 1987 to 1989. Following this, he gained admission to the University of Ghana where he obtained Bachelor of Arts in Archaeology and Sociology.

Politics

As Parliamentary Candidate 
In The 2000 Ghana Elections he stood as a parliamentary candidate in the Suhum constituency and lost to Ransford Agyapong the New Patriotic Party candidate by gaining 12,368 of the votes cast  representing 41.20% whilst the winner got 16,494 votes  representing 54.90%. In 2004 he once again stood for the parliamentary seat in the Suhum Constituency and lost to the New Patriotic Party's  Frederick Opare-Ansah who got a 21,720 votes representing 55.20% against his 17,125 votes representing 43.50%.

In 2012 when his party was in power he once again stood for the parliamentary candidate for the Suhum seat and lost by 388 votes the closest he had come in the three times he had stood for the parliamentary seat. He lost to the incumbent his rival from the 2004 Elections Frederick Opare-Ansah, who got 24,046 votes representing 49.28% whilst he got 23,658 representing 48.49%.

Ghana Tourism Authority 
In 2009 he was appointed as the chief executive officer of the Ghana Tourism Authority. He served in that role from 2009 to January 2013. In mid 2011, under his leadership and the Ministry of Tourism, the then Ghana Tourist Board was reshaped into the Ghana Tourism Authority to enhance its role in promoting tourism in Ghana through the Parliament of Ghana's passage of ACT 817.

Minister of State

Regional Minister 
In February 2013 Debrah was nominated by John Dramani Mahama to serve in the position of Eastern Regional Minister. After a month he was moved from Eastern Region to the capital region Greater Accra to serve as the Greater Accra Regional Minister.

 He served in that role for year and was seen as someone championing the involvement of the local government in nation building.

Minister for Local Government and Rural Development 
Debrah was appointed to serve as Minister in charge of Local Government and Rural Development after serving as regional minister for both Greater Accra Region and Eastern Region. This was seen by experts as a move to ensure the massive involvement of the local authorities and people in decision making and nation building.

Chief of Staff 
In 2015, February, Julius Debrah was appointed Chief of Staff by President John Dramani Mahama to replace Prosper Bani after serving as the Minister of Local Government and Rural Development the one year prior. Debrah's appointment was received with joy by members of the National Democratic Congress.

Personal life 
A native of Obomeng Kwahu, Debrah is married with two children.

References 

Living people
National Democratic Congress (Ghana) politicians
Local government ministers of Ghana
1966 births
University of Ghana alumni
Ghanaian civil servants
People from Eastern Region (Ghana)
Alumni of Achimota School
Chiefs of Staff of Ghana